Pontotoc High School is a secondary school in Pontotoc, Mississippi.

Its boundary covers almost all of Pontotoc and some unincorporated areas.

Sports
Pontotoc High School is active in 15 varsity sports and play as "The Warriors."  Varsity sports include Baseball, Basketball, Bowling, Cross Country Running, Football, Golf, Powerlifting, Soccer, Softball, Tennis, Track and Field, and Volleyball.

Basketball 

The Warriors and Lady Warriors have a history of success at division, North Half, and state levels of competition. The Warriors are coached by Chris Vandiver, and the Lady Warriors are coached by Bill Russell.

The 2009-2010 Warriors were the first boys team in Pontotoc history to make it to the 3rd round of the North Half tournament, the first to win North Half, and the first to go to the State Tournament in Jackson, Mississippi. The boys also hosted the North Half for the first time in school history. Pontotoc beat Louisville in the first round 71–47. In the second round they beat Lewisburg 72–58 to make history and go to the third round for the first time in school history. The Warriors made more history with a 74–64 win over Greenwood to send them to the North Half championship and to the state tournament. In the North Half championship the Warriors beat Center Hill 61-56 and were crowned North Half champs. The Warriors historic run was ended when St. Stanislaus beat them 65–39 in the first round of State.

Football 
The Warrior football team competes in Mississippi's Division 1-4A. The Warriors are coached by Jeffery Carter.

Tennis 
The 2008 Pontotoc Warriors qualified two girls for the state tournament — Katherine Downing and Frankie Turner. They defeated Feliciy Flesher and Erin Dyer of Oxford to win the State Championship. The Warrior and Lady Warrior tennis teams are coached by Kevin Morrow.

Bowling
Pontotoc's bowling team, a relatively new sport at PHS, is already garnering attention around the state as the boys bowling team won Mississippi's Class I title in 2009. The bowling teams are coached by Edgar Sorto. The Boys Bowling Team came in 4th at the 2010 State Championship, and they were the only 4A team that made it to State.

Cross Country 
The girls and boys cross country teams, coached by Mike Bain, a Mississippi coaching legend, have a long history of success at the division and state level. The Lady Warrior cross country team won the 2007 4A state championship. And the girls and boys teams won the 2009 State Championship.

Extracurriculars
The school participates in Band, Cheerleading, and Dance competitions.

Cheerleading 
Pontotoc High School's cheerleading squad consists of 16 girls who compete for the spots each year in an extremely competitive tryout week. In 2008, the Warrior Cheerleaders won the State 4A Small Division state championship. They took home the Academic Award, stating that they had the highest GPA of all squads in Mississippi from 1A-5A.

Bands
Though the sports at Pontotoc High School garner attention and praise from around the state, Pontotoc High School's most respected and successful program is the Pontotoc Warrior Band Program. Sarah Todd is the director of bands at Pontotoc High School. Assistant directors of bands are Keith Morgan and Richie Watson.

Marching Band

The Pontotoc Warrior Marching band consists of around 145 members, including drum majors, color guard members, marching percussion, marching winds, and a pit. The Warrior Marching Band is known throughout the state for its outstanding musical and marching abilities.

Concert Bands
The Pontotoc High School band consists of four concert bands: the Symphonic Band, the Concert Band, the Varsity Band, and the Jazz Band. The Symphonic Band is directed by Sarah Todd, the Concert Band is directed by Keith Morgan, the Varsity Band and Jazz Band are directed by Richie Watson.

References

External links
 

Schools in Pontotoc County, Mississippi
Public high schools in Mississippi